Premna tanganyikensis is a species of plant in the family Lamiaceae. It is found in Mozambique and Tanzania.

References

tangyikensis
Flora of Tanzania
Flora of Mozambique
Vulnerable flora of Africa
Taxonomy articles created by Polbot